Frog Went A-Courtin' is a book by John Langstaff and illustrated by Feodor Rojankovsky. Released by Harcourt, it was the recipient of the Caldecott Medal for illustration in 1956. It is based on the folk song "Frog Went A-Courting." In 1961, Weston Woods Studios made an iconographic version of the story produced and directed by Morton Schindel, narrated by the author with music by Arthur Kleiner, culminating in a sing-along, sung by the story's narrator. In 2007, the film has been remade with narration and music by Jack Sundrud and Rusty Young.

References

1955 children's books
American picture books
Caldecott Medal–winning works
Books about frogs
Harcourt (publisher) books